Oregon State Beavers 

Jeffrey William Monson (born January 18, 1971) is an American-Russian mixed martial artist, boxer, and submission grappler who competes primarily in the Heavyweight division. A professional competitor since 1997, he has competed for the UFC, Strikeforce, DREAM, PRIDE, M-1 Global, Impact FC, World Victory Road, and Cage Warriors. In Brazilian jiu-jitsu and grappling, Monson is a two-time winner of the ADCC Submission Wrestling World Championship and is a No Gi Brazilian jiu-jitsu World Champion.

Outside of fighting, Monson, an anarcho-communist, is known for his radical left-wing political views. In 2018, Monson was elected to the city Duma of Krasnogorsk. He is additionally the host of the multi-platform political and social commentary program Monson TV on Russian state-funded RT.

Early life
Monson was born in Saint Paul, Minnesota, where he also grew up for most of his childhood. He attended Timberline High School and continued on as a Division I wrestler at Oregon State University and at the University of Illinois and was a Pac-10 champion for Oregon State. He also competed at senior level at USA Wrestling events for a number of years.

Monson received a bachelor's degree in psychology from the University of Illinois and a master's degree in psychology from the University of Minnesota Duluth, where he was the assistant coach of the wrestling team.

He worked as a mental health professional for five years, both in a crisis evaluation role for Cascade Mental Health in Lewis County, Washington, as well as a child and family counselor. However, having major success in Abu Dhabi and other MMA shows, he decided to leave the mental health profession to devote himself full-time to mixed martial arts.

Martial arts background and nickname
Monson is a Brazilian jiu-jitsu black belt and a two-time Abu Dhabi Combat Club Submission Wrestling World Champion. He is an MMA fighter and has also had three professional boxing bouts. His boxing record is two wins and one draw.

Monson is considered to be one of the world's top submission grapplers. He is a multiple event winner at NAGA, Grapplers Quest and FILA, among other submission tournaments. He is nicknamed "The Snowman" for his performance at the 1999 Abu Dhabi Combat Club Submission Wrestling World Championship. The Brazilian fighters at the tournament gave him the nickname because he came in as an unknown, but beat four Brazilians in a row to win the 88–98 kilogram weight class. As he went along in the tournament and continued to beat his opponents, they said he was like a snowball (white, compact, rolling and getting bigger and stronger as the tournament went on).

Mixed martial arts career

Ultimate Fighting Championship
After 14 straight victories, Monson was signed by the UFC.

At UFC 57, Monson submitted Branden Lee Hinkle by north–south choke in the first round. At UFC 59, he fought Brazilian jiu-jitsu black belt Marcio Cruz (ADCC veteran and longtime rival). Monson won by decision after three rounds. At UFC 61, Monson fought another Brazilian jiu-jitsu black belt in Anthony Perosh, whom Monson defeated by TKO in the first round.

On November 18, 2006, at UFC 65, Monson fought Tim Sylvia for the UFC Heavyweight Championship. He lost a five-round decision and would later ask to be released from his UFC contract in the hopes of facing then-PRIDE Heavyweight Champion Fedor Emelianenko at a BodogFIGHT scheduled for March 2007. However, negotiations fell through and the match did not happen during that time.

PRIDE
At the main event of PRIDE 34, on April 8, 2007, Monson defeated Kazuyuki Fujita via rear-naked choke submission at 6:37 of the opening round.

Post-PRIDE
His next fight was scheduled to be against Chris Guillen on August 17, 2007, for the Global Fighting Championships' Heavyweight Championship, but the event was canceled after four of the eight scheduled bouts were removed from the card. Monson lost against Pedro Rizzo at Art of War 3, which was held on September 1, 2007. During the bout, Monson displayed a much improved level of striking, and kept the fight standing virtually the entire time.

On September 7, 2007, Monson won two matches in the FILA World Championship in Turkey, defeating France's Zoro Piere and England's Tom Blackledge by submission. Monson was awarded the 275-pound gold medal when his final opponent Ramon Diaz suffered an injury and was forced to bow out.

Monson defeated former UFC Heavyweight Champion Ricco Rodriguez in the main event of the Mixed Fighting Alliance "There Will Be Blood" event on December 13, 2008. He avenged a loss to Rodriguez from almost seven years prior.

On March 21, 2009, Monson won a controversial decision against Roy Nelson on Roy Jones Jr.'s hybrid boxing/MMA card "March Badness." He then beat Sergej Maslobojev on a Cage Wars card on March 29, 2009. He immediately went to Japan and defeated top Russian Heavyweight Sergei Kharitonov on April 5, 2009, at Dream 8, giving him three wins in two weeks.

On September 12, 2009, at Bitetti Combat MMA 4, Monson had his seven-fight win streak snapped, losing in a rematch with Pedro Rizzo by unanimous decision.

At 5150 Combat League/Xtreme Fighting League: New Years Revolution, Monson defeated John Brown by split decision on January 16, 2010.

On March 13, 2010, Monson fought in France at 100% Fight II and defeated Francisco Nonato by submission (guillotine choke) in the first round. He lost to Travis Wiuff in a split decision at XKL Evolution 2 on April 24, 2010.
On May 14, 2010, he lost in Abu Dhabi to Shamil Abdurahimov by majority decision at the Abu Dhabi Fighting Championship in the Quarter Finals of the 2010 Openweight Grand Prix.

Monson defeated Bira Lima at Impact FC 1 in Australia on July 10, 2010, by unanimous decision.

Monson faced Jason Guida on August 21, 2010, at an event called "Fight Time 1". He defeated Jason Guida at 3:04 in the second round by a guillotine choke submission.

His next fight was scheduled to be against Neil Wain at "KnuckleUp: Kings of the North," but Neil Wain pulled out of the fight due to injuries. Stepping in to replace Wain was the very man who took him out of the fight, Dave Keeley. Monson defeated Keeley by submission (north–south choke) in the first round.

Monson defeated Sergey Shemetov at the inaugural Israel Fighting Championship event on November 9. After the fight, he said he wanted to drop down to the Light Heavyweight division for his next fight and his friend, Ricco Rodriguez, who later won his fight in the main event, said he wanted to fight Monson in the International Fighting Championships (IFC) at Light Heavyweight.

In 2011, Monson defeated Lee Mein on January 7 and Tony Lopez on April 1 in a five-round decision.

Monson's next fight was against Maro Perak where he won a three-round decision.

Monson said that after he fought in April and May, he hoped the UFC would want him back, but this time he would like to fight in the Light Heavyweight division.

Monson stepped in for injured Shane del Rosario to face prospect Daniel Cormier on the June 18 Strikeforce: Overeem vs. Werdum card in Dallas, Texas, and lost via fight via unanimous decision.

Monson defeated Paul Taylor in Birmingham, England at the Sprawl n Brawl promotion on October 9, 2011.

Monson fought Fedor Emelianenko at M-1 Global: Fedor vs. Monson on November 20, 2011, in Moscow, Russia and lost by unanimous decision.

Monson was unbeaten in his four fights after the loss against Fedor, and in June 2012 signed a four-fight deal with the Super Fight League in India.
Monson was originally announced to fight at SFL 4 on September 29 against former UFC fighter Todd Duffee but after the event was pushed back twice the SFL decided to change the structure of their shows, with weekly events replacing monthly events. Duffee and SFL agreed on his departure in September and he is currently fighting in the UFC. Following this news, the fight was canceled.

From June 2013 to April 2014, Monson would go 1–6 in seven fights, defeating Denis Komkin, and losing to notable fighters such as Alexey Oleynik, Satoshi Ishii, and Mike Hayes. After a loss to up-and-comer Chaban Ka, Monson defeated Kevin Brooks via north–south choke at Fight Time 20 on August 29, 2014.

Monson faced Dmitry Titkov on September 5, 2014, at Fight Star: Saransk vs. Penza. He lost the fight by cut TKO, after a cut opened up on Monson.

Monson then faced Mikhail Shein at Fight Star: The Battle of the Sura 2. He won the fight via rear-naked choke in the second round.

Monson faced Ivan Shtyrkov on 6 May, the promoter and him decided to do an exhibition match due to Monson having an injury that would have forced him out of a legitimate MMA match. When the match started it quickly became clear that Shtyrkov was treating it as a real fight and shortly after dropping Monson with a straight right finished him with an armbar on his injured arm.

On 12 January 2021, Monson announced his official retirement from all forms of combat sports, including both MMA and Submission Grappling.

Arnold Gracie competition incident
In 2004, when facing Márcio Cruz at the Arnold Gracie IBJJF competition, Monson allegedly attacked a referee and caused a brawl following the use of a "can opener" submission. The original attack was not caught on camera, but Monson is shown being restrained by several competition staff and coaches. As a result of this brawl the "can opener" was made illegal in IBJJF competitions. Both Monson and Pe de Pano were barred from competing at the next year's event.

Politics

Monson is an anarcho-communist. He presently hosts a multi-platform (TV/social media) political and social commentary program on Russian state-funded RT called, Monson TV.

In 2015, Monson sought Russian citizenship, citing that he felt "Russian in spirit." He was granted Russian citizenship in 2018 by President Vladimir Putin.

In April 2016, Monson expressed his desire to join the Communist Party of the Russian Federation in a video appeal to the party and praised socialism as "the only way as a human species that we’re going to survive." Soon after, he was invited to meet Communist Party of the Russian Federation leader Gennady Zyuganov in his office in the State Duma, where they discussed the future of communism in Russia and globally. Monson later led a procession across Red Square into Lenin's Mausoleum together with Zyuganov dedicated to the anniversary of Vladimir Lenin's birth. He was appointed as a special representative for international cooperation by the Communist Party of the Russian Federation's Sport Club in June 2016.

Monson was the subject of a party political advertisement released in the run-up to the 2016 State Duma Elections.
 In an interview, Monson stated his political views as follows: "I am an anarchist, someone who would like to do away with all class hierarchy in society and the institutions that promote this inequality."

In solidarity, Monson is also a member of the Industrial Workers of the World.

On September 11, 2016, Monson announced on Twitter that he had become a citizen of the Luhansk People's Republic to support local people who suffered during the War in Donbas. He was made an honorary citizen of the Republic of Abkhazia in October 2016 for "supporting nations striving for self-determination."

On September 9, 2018, Monson was elected to the city's Duma (local city parliament) of Krasnogorsk, a city located near Moscow. Monson won the mandate as a candidate on the list of the ruling party United Russia, which nominated him without membership in the party. In order to be able to carry out the mandate, Monson had to give up his American citizenship in accordance with Russian law.

Monson has expressed explicit support for the 2022 Russian invasion of Ukraine.

Personal life

Monson has two children from his first marriage, Michaela and Josh. He has a daughter, Willow, from his second marriage. He now has a fourth child from a Russian woman. Monson is a Christian and has said he prayed to God before every match.

In late 2008, Monson spraypainted an anarchy symbol, peace symbol, "no war", and "no poverty" on the Washington State Capitol in photographs published in ESPN The Magazine. Charged with first-degree criminal mischief, Monson pled guilty in July 2009.

Championships and accomplishments

Mixed martial arts
 International Sport Karate Association
 ISKA World Heavyweight Championship (One time; first; former)
 Sprawl 'N Brawl
 SB Intercontinental Heavyweight Championship (One time)
 Strength and Honor Championship
 SHC Heavyweight Championship (One time)
 Cage Warriors Fighting Championship
 Cage Warriors Heavyweight Championship (One time)
 Two Successful Title Defenses
 Ultimate Fighting Championship
 Knockout of the Night (One time) vs. Anthony Perosh 
 PRIDE Fighting Championships
 Won the final PRIDE fight
 X Fighting Championships
 XFC Heavyweight Championship (One time)
 SportFight
 SportFight Heavyweight Championship (One time)

Submission grappling
 Abu Dhabi Combat Club
 2009 ADCC Submission Wrestling World Championships Bronze Medalist
 2005 ADCC Submission Wrestling World Championships Gold Medalist
 2001 ADCC Submission Wrestling World Championships Silver Medalist
 2000 ADCC Submission Wrestling World Championships Silver Medalist
 1999 ADCC Submission Wrestling World Championships Gold Medalist
 International Federation of Associated Wrestling Styles
 2012 FILA Grappling World Championships Senior No-Gi Gold Medalist
 2011 FILA Grand Prix Espoir No-Gi Absolute Silver Medalist
 2008 FILA Grappling World Championships Senior No-Gi Gold Medalist
 2007 FILA Grappling World Championships Senior No-Gi Gold Medalist
 International Brazilian Jiu-Jitsu Federation
 2007 IBJJF World Jiu-Jitsu Championships Black Belt No-Gi Absolute Gold Medalist
 2007 IBJJF World Jiu-Jitsu Championships Black Belt No-Gi Silver Medalist
 2001 Pan American Championships Blue Belt Gold Medalist
 USA Wrestling
 FILA World Team Trials Senior No-Gi Winner (2007, 2008)
 FILA World Team Trials Senior No-Gi Runner-up (2009)
 On the Mat
 2009 Submission Grappler of the year
 2004 Submission Grappler of the Year

Amateur wrestling
 USA Wrestling
 Northwest Senior Greco-Roman Regional Championship (1998)
 Northwest Senior Freestyle Regional Championship Runner-up (1998)
 National Collegiate Athletic Association
 Pac-10 Conference Championship (1992)

Mixed martial arts record

|-
| Draw
| align=center| 61–26–2
| Nikolai Savilov
| Draw
| Arta MMA: Battle For Ryzan
| 
| align=center| 2
| align=center| 5:00
| Ryazan, Russia
|
|-
| Win
| align=center| 61–26–1
| Alex Kardo
| Submission (north-south choke)
| Industrials Battle in Belgorod
| 
| align=center| 2
| align=center| 3:30
| Belgorod, Russia
|
|-
| Loss
| align=center| 60–26–1
| Ivan Shtyrkov
| Submission (armbar)
| Titov Boxing Promotion: Monson vs. Shtyrkov
| 
| align=center| 1
| align=center| 1:01
| Yekaterinburg, Russia
| 
|-
| Win
| align=center| 60–25–1
| Anton Lotkov
| Submission (north-south choke)
| Fight Stars 2
| 
| align=center| 1
| align=center| 1:45
| Balakovo, Russia
|
|-
| Loss
| align=center| 59–25–1
| Donald Njatah Nya
| KO (punch)
| Mix Fight Combat
| 
| align=center| 1
| align=center| 0:50
| Khimki, Russia
| 
|-
| Win
| align=center| 59–24–1
| Konstantin Skrelya
| Submission (north-south choke)
| OFS: Octagon Fighting Sensation 6
| 
| align=center| 1
| align=center| 2:13
| Moscow, Russia
|
|-
| Win
| align=center| 58–24–1
| Nikolay Savilov
| DQ (soccer kicks after bell)
| Shield-Peresvet 3
| 
| align=center| 1
| align=center| 5:00
| Moscow, Russia
|
|-
| Loss
| align=center| 57–24–1
| Zamirbek Syrgabaev
| Decision (unanimous)
| JFC: Jashkuch Fighting Championship Fight Night
| 
| align=center| 3
| align=center| 5:00
| Bishkek, Kyrgyzstan
|
|-
| Win
| align=center| 57–23–1
| Denis Komkin
| Decision (unanimous)
| Fightspirit Championship 5
| 
| align=center| 3
| align=center| 5:00
| Kolpino, Russia
|
|-
| Loss
| align=center| 56–23–1
| Evgeny Erokhin
| TKO (punches)
| FEFoFP: Mayor's Cup
| 
| align=center| 2
| align=center| 4:43
| Khabarovsk, Russia
|
|-
| Loss
| align=center| 56–22–1
| Evgeny Egemberdiev
| Decision (unanimous)
| Alash Pride FC: Royal Plaza Vol. 5
| 
| align=center| 3
| align=center| 5:00
| Almaty, Kazakhstan
| 
|-
| Loss
| align=center| 56–21–1
| D.J. Linderman
| TKO (punches)
| Fight Time 24: MMA Kings
| 
| align=center| 5
| align=center| 1:42
| Fort Lauderdale, Florida, United States
| 
|-
| Win
| align=center| 56–20–1
| Alexander Stolyarov
| Submission (north-south choke)
| OFS: Octagon Fighting Sensation 3
| 
| align=center| 3
| align=center| 4:29
| Yaroslavl, Russia
| 
|-
| Win
| align=center| 55–20–1
| Vladimir Nepochatov
| Submission (north-south choke)
| Oplot Challenge 108
| 
| align=center| 1
| align=center| 2:40
| Moscow, Russia
| 
|-
| Win
| align=center| 54–20–1
| Ilya Shcheglov
| Submission (north-south choke)
| Eurasian Fighting Championship: Altay Great Battle
| 
| align=center| 2
| align=center| 2:45
| Barnaul, Russia
| 
|-
| Win
| align=center| 53–20–1
| Evgeniy Bykov
| Submission (rear-naked choke)
| Fight Alliance Promotions: Gladiator Fighting 2
| 
| align=center| 1
| align=center| 1:16
| Troitsk, Moscow, Russia
|
|-
| Win
| align=center| 52–20–1
| Mikhail Shein
| Submission (rear-naked choke)
| Fight Stars: The Battle of the Sura 2
| 
| align=center| 2
| align=center| 4:05
| Penza, Russia
|
|-
| Loss
| align=center| 51–20–1
| Dmitry Titkov
| Decision (unanimous)
| Fight Stars: Saransk vs. Penza
| 
| align=center| 3
| align=center| 5:00
| Saransk, Russia
| 
|-
| Win
| align=center| 51–19–1
| Kevin Brooks
| Submission (north-south choke)
| Fight Time 20
| 
| align=center| 1
| align=center| 1:08
| Fort Lauderdale, Florida, United States
|
|-
| Loss
| align=center| 50–19–1
| Chaban Ka
| TKO (punches)
| M-1 Challenge 47
| 
| align=center| 1
| align=center| 1:31
| Orenburg, Russia
|
|-
| Loss
| align=center| 50–18–1
| Shakhmaral Dzhepisov
| KO (punches)
| Diamond Fight
| 
| align=center| 3
| align=center| 3:38
| Almaty, Kazakhstan
|
|-
| Loss
| align=center| 50–17–1
| Mike Hayes
| TKO (head kick and punches)
| CWC 9: Cage Warrior Combat 9
| 
| align=center| 3
| align=center| 1:21
| Kent, Washington, United States
|
|-
| Loss
| align=center| 50–16–1
| Satoshi Ishii
| Decision (majority)
| M-1 Challenge 42
| 
| align=center| 3
| align=center| 5:00
| St. Petersburg, Russia
|
|-
| Win
| align=center| 50–15–1
| Denis Komkin
| Decision (split)
| Coliseum Fighting Championship: New History
| 
| align=center| 3
| align=center| 5:00
| St. Petersburg, Russia
|
|-
| Loss
| align=center| 49–15–1
| Alexey Oleynik
| Submission (rear-naked choke)
| Oplot Challenge 54
| |
| align=center| 2
| align=center| 3:26
| Kharkiv, Ukraine
|
|-
| Loss
| align=center| 49–14–1
| Magomed Malikov
| TKO (doctor stoppage)
| M-1 Challenge 40
| 
| align=center| 2
| align=center| 2:58
| Dzheyrakhsky District, Ingushetia, Russia
|
|-
| Win
| align=center| 49–13–1
| Drazen Forgac
| TKO (knee injury)
| Strength & Honor Championship 7
| 
| align=center| 2
| align=center| 0:58
| Geneva, Switzerland
| 
|-
| Win
| align=center| 48–13–1
| Dong Gook Kang
| Decision (unanimous)
| Road FC 10: Monson vs. Kang
| 
| align=center| 3
| align=center| 5:00
| Busan, South Korea
|
|-
| Win
| align=center| 47–13–1
| Alexander Emelianenko
| Submission (north-south choke)
| M-1 Challenge 35
| 
| align=center| 2
| align=center| 3:17
| St. Petersburg, Russia
|
|-
| Win
| align=center| 46–13–1
| Denis Komkin
| Submission (north-south choke)
| M-1 Global: Fedor vs. Rizzo
| 
| align=center| 1
| align=center| 1:58
| St. Petersburg, Russia
|
|-
| Win
| align=center| 45–13–1
| Jim York
| Decision (unanimous)
| Cage Fighting Championships 21
| 
| align=center| 3
| align=center| 5:00
| Sydney, New South Wales, Australia
|
|-
| Draw
| align=center| 44–13–1
| Chaban Ka
| Draw
| 100% Fight 11: Explosion
| 
| align=center| 3
| align=center| 5:00
| Paris, France
|
|-
| Win
| align=center| 44–13
| Alexey Oleynik
| Decision (split)
| M-1 Challenge 31
| 
| align=center| 3
| align=center| 5:00
| St. Petersburg, Russia
|
|-
| Loss
| align=center| 43–13
| Fedor Emelianenko
| Decision (unanimous)
| M-1 Global: Fedor vs. Monson
| 
| align=center| 3
| align=center| 5:00
| Moscow, Russia
|
|-
| Win
| align=center| 43–12
| Paul Taylor
| Submission (rear-naked choke)
| Sprawl n Brawl 8: Return of the Cyborg
| 
| align=center| 1
| align=center| 4:20
| Edgbaston, Birmingham, England
| 
|-
| Loss
| align=center| 42–12
| Daniel Cormier
| Decision (unanimous)
| Strikeforce: Overeem vs. Werdum
| 
| align=center| 3
| align=center| 5:00
| Dallas, Texas, United States
| 
|-
| Win
| align=center| 42–11
| Maro Perak
| Decision (unanimous)
| SHC 4: Monson vs. Perak
| 
| align=center| 3
| align=center| 5:00
| Geneva, Switzerland
| 
|-
| Win
| align=center| 41–11
| Tony Lopez
| Decision (unanimous)
| Fight Time 4: MMA Heavyweight Explosion
| 
| align=center| 5
| align=center| 5:00
| Fort Lauderdale, Florida, United States
| 
|-
| Win
| align=center| 40–11
| Lee Mein
| Submission (guillotine choke)
| CFM 1: Monson vs. Mein
| 
| align=center| 1
| align=center| 3:31
| Winnipeg, Manitoba, Canada
|
|-
| Win
| align=center| 39–11
| Sergey Shemetov
| Submission (americana)
| Israel FC: Genesis
| 
| align=center| 1
| align=center| 4:09
| Tel Aviv, Israel
|
|-
| Win
| align=center| 38–11
| Travis Fulton
| Submission (kimura)
| Fight Time 2
| 
| align=center| 1
| align=center| 4:40
| Pompano Beach, Florida, United States
|
|-
| Win
| align=center| 37–11
| Dave Keeley
| Submission (north-south choke)
| KUMMA: Kings of the North
| 
| align=center| 1
| align=center| 1:41
| Lancashire, England
|
|-
| Win
| align=center| 36–11
| Jason Guida
| Submission (rear-naked choke)
| Fight Time 1
| 
| align=center| 2
| align=center| 3:04
| Pompano Beach, Florida, United States
|
|-
| Win
| align=center| 35–11
| Ubiratan Marinho Lima
| Decision (unanimous)
| Impact FC 1
| 
| align=center| 3
| align=center| 5:00
| Brisbane, Australia
|
|-
| Loss
| align=center| 34–11
| Shamil Abdurakhimov
| Decision (majority)
| ADFC: Battle of the Champions
| 
| align=center| 3
| align=center| 5:00
| Abu Dhabi, United Arab Emirates
|
|-
| Loss
| align=center| 34–10
| Travis Wiuff
| Decision (split)
| CFX / XKL: Mayhem in Minneapolis
| 
| align=center| 3
| align=center| 5:00
| Minneapolis, Minnesota, United States
|
|-
| Win
| align=center| 34–9
| Francisco Nonato
| Submission (guillotine choke)
| 100% Fight: 100 Percent Fight 2
| 
| align=center| 1
| align=center| 2:27
| Paris, France
|
|-
| Win
| align=center| 33–9
| John Brown
| Decision (split)
| 5150 Combat League / XFL: New Year's Revolution
| 
| align=center| 3
| align=center| 5:00
| Tulsa, Oklahoma, United States
|
|-
| Loss
| align=center| 32–9
| Pedro Rizzo
| Decision (unanimous)
| Bitetti Combat MMA 4
| 
| align=center| 3
| align=center| 5:00
| Rio de Janeiro, Brazil
|
|-
| Win
| align=center| 32–8
| Jimmy Ambriz
| Submission (rear-naked choke)
| TC 33: Bad Intentions
| 
| align=center| 1
| align=center| 1:09
| Mexico City, Mexico
|
|-
| Win
| align=center| 31–8
| Sergei Kharitonov
| Submission (north-south choke)
| DREAM 8
| 
| align=center| 1
| align=center| 1:42
| Nagoya, Aichi, Japan
|
|-
| Win
| align=center| 30–8
| Sergej Maslobojev
| Submission (north-south choke)
| CW 11: Decade
| 
| align=center| 2
| align=center| 2:30
| Belfast, Northern Ireland
|
|-
| Win
| align=center| 29–8
| Roy Nelson
| Decision (unanimous)
| SRP: March Badness
| 
| align=center| 3
| align=center| 5:00
| Pensacola, Florida, United States
|
|-
| Win
| align=center| 28–8
| Ricco Rodriguez
| Decision (unanimous)
| MFA: There Will Be Blood
| 
| align=center| 3
| align=center| 5:00
| Miami, Florida, United States
|
|-
| Win
| align=center| 27–8
| Jimmy Ambriz
| Submission (north-south choke)
| Beatdown: 4 Bears Casino
| 
| align=center| 1
| align=center| 1:50
| New Town, North Dakota, United States
|
|-
| Win
| align=center| 26–8
| Mark Kerr
| Submission (rear-naked choke)
| Vengeance Fighting Championship 1
| 
| align=center| 1
| align=center| 3:15
| Concord, North Carolina, United States
|
|-
| Loss
| align=center| 25–8
| Josh Barnett
| Decision (split)
| World Victory Road Presents: Sengoku 2
| 
| align=center| 3
| align=center| 5:00
| Tokyo, Japan
|
|-
| Win
| align=center| 25–7
| Hakim Gouram
| Decision (unanimous)
| PFP: Ring of Fire
| 
| align=center| 3
| align=center| 5:00
| Quezon City, Philippines
|
|-
| Loss
| align=center| 24–7
| Pedro Rizzo
| TKO (punches)
| Art of War 3
| 
| align=center| 3
| align=center| 2:40
| Dallas, Texas, United States
| 
|-
| Win
| align=center| 24–6
| Kazuyuki Fujita
| Submission (rear-naked choke)
| PRIDE 34
| 
| align=center| 1
| align=center| 6:37
| Saitama, Saitama, Japan
|
|-
| Loss
| align=center| 23–6
| Tim Sylvia
| Decision (unanimous)
| UFC 65: Bad Intentions
| 
| align=center| 5
| align=center| 5:00
| Sacramento, United States
| 
|-
| Win
| align=center| 23–5
| Anthony Perosh
| TKO (punches)
| UFC 61: Bitter Rivals
| 
| align=center| 1
| align=center| 2:43
| Las Vegas, Nevada, United States
| 
|-
| Win
| align=center| 22–5
| Márcio Cruz
| Decision (split)
| UFC 59: Reality Check
| 
| align=center| 3
| align=center| 5:00
| Anaheim, California, United States
|
|-
| Win
| align=center| 21–5
| Branden Lee Hinkle
| Technical Submission (north-south choke)
| UFC 57: Liddell vs. Couture 3
| 
| align=center| 1
| align=center| 4:35
| Las Vegas, Nevada, United States
|
|-
| Win
| align=center| 20–5
| Marc Emmanuel
| Submission (rear-naked choke)
| CWFC: Strike Force 4
| 
| align=center| 1
| align=center| 0:58
| Coventry, England
| 
|-
| Win
| align=center| 19–5
| Devin Cole
| Decision (unanimous)
| XFC: Dome of Destruction 3
| 
| align=center| 3
| align=center| 5:00
| Tacoma, Washington, United States
| 
|-
| Win
| align=center| 18–5
| Jay White
| Submission (rear-naked choke)
| SF 12: Breakout
| 
| align=center| 1
| align=center| 1:21
| Portland, Oregon, United States
| 
|-
| Win
| align=center| 17–5
| Rich Wilson
| Submission (armbar)
| Extreme Wars: X-1
| 
| align=center| 1
| align=center| 1:56
| Honolulu, Hawaii, United States
|
|-
| Win
| align=center| 16–5
| Tengiz Tedoradze
| Submission (rear-naked choke)
| CWFC: Ultimate Force
| 
| align=center| 1
| align=center| 1:59
| Sheffield, England
| 
|-
| Win
| align=center| 15–5
| Jay White
| TKO (injury)
| Euphoria: USA vs. the World
| 
| align=center| 1
| align=center| 4:07
| Atlantic City, New Jersey, United States
|
|-
| Win
| align=center| 14–5
| Brian Stromberg
| Submission (rear-naked choke)
| SF 8: Justice
| 
| align=center| 1
| align=center| N/A
| Gresham, Oregon, United States
|
|-
| Win
| align=center| 13–5
| Tengiz Tedoradze
| Submission (rear-naked choke)
| Cage Warriors 9: Xtreme Xmas
| 
| align=center| 1
| align=center| 3:51
| Sheffield, England
| 
|-
| Win
| align=center| 12–5
| Pat Stano
| TKO (knee to the body)
| Euphoria: Road to the Titles
| 
| align=center| 2
| align=center| 3:11
| Atlantic City, New Jersey, United States
|
|-
| Win
| align=center| 11–5
| Carlos Clayton
| Decision (unanimous)
| AFC: Brazil 1
| 
| align=center| 3
| align=center| 5:00
| Rio de Janeiro, Brazil
|
|-
| Win
| align=center| 10–5
| Don Richards
| Submission (north-south choke)
| IHC 7: The Crucible
| 
| align=center| 2
| align=center| 2:25
| Hammond, Indiana, United States
|
|-
| Win
| align=center| 9–5
| Joe Nye
| Submission (rear-naked choke)
| Mass Destruction 12
| 
| align=center| 1
| align=center| 3:02
| Taunton, Massachusetts, United States
|
|-
| Win
| align=center| 8–5
| Mike Delaney
| Submission (north-south choke)
| Absolute Fighting Championships 4
| 
| align=center| 1
| align=center| 4:27
| Fort Lauderdale, Florida, United States
|
|-
| Loss
| align=center| 7–5
| Forrest Griffin
| Decision (unanimous)
| WEFC 1: Bring it On
| 
| align=center| 4
| align=center| 4:20
| Marietta, Georgia, United States
|
|-
| Loss
| align=center| 7–4
| Ricco Rodriguez
| TKO (punches)
| UFC 35
| 
| align=center| 3
| align=center| 3:00
| Uncasville, Connecticut, United States
|
|-
| Win
| align=center| 7–3
| Roman Roytberg
| Submission (north-south choke)
| AMC: Revenge of the Warriors
| 
| align=center| 1
| align=center| N/A
| Rochester, Washington, United States
|
|-
| Loss
| align=center| 6–3
| Chuck Liddell
| Decision (unanimous)
| UFC 29
| 
| align=center| 3
| align=center| 5:00
| Tokyo, Japan
| 
|-
| Win
| align=center| 6–2
| Tim Lajcik
| Decision (unanimous)
| UFC 27
| 
| align=center| 2
| align=center| 5:00
| New Orleans, Louisiana, United States
|
|-
| Win
| align=center| 5–2
| Bob Gilstrap
| Decision (unanimous)
| AMC: Return of the Gladiators 1
| 
| align=center| 3
| align=center| 5:00
| Rochester, Washington, United States
|
|-
| Loss
| align=center| 4–2
| David Dodd
| Submission (armbar)
| Extreme Challenge 23
| 
| align=center| 1
| align=center| 0:46
| Indianapolis, Indiana, United States
|
|-
| Win
| align=center| 4–1
| Roger Neff
| Decision
| Ultimate Ring Challenge
| 
| align=center| 3
| align=center| 5:00
| Wenatchee, Washington, United States
|
|-
| Loss
| align=center| 3–1
| Tommy Sauer
| Submission (rear-naked choke)
| Extreme Challenge 20
| 
| align=center| 1
| align=center| 3:47
| Davenport, Iowa, United States
|
|-
| Win
| align=center| 3–0
| John Renfroe
| TKO (submission to punches)
| Ultimate Warrior Challenge
| 
| align=center| 1
| align=center| 2:45
| Vancouver, British Columbia, Canada
|
|-
| Win
| align=center| 2–0
| Cy Cross
| Submission (rear-naked choke)
| UFCF: Night of Champions
| 
| align=center| 1
| align=center| 3:47
| Lynnwood, Washington, United States
|
|-
| Win
| align=center| 1–0
| Luther Norberg
| Decision (unanimous)
| UFCF: Gladiators
| 
| align=center| 1
| align=center| N/A
| No location reported
|

Professional boxing record

{|class="wikitable" style="text-align:center; font-size:95%"
|-
!
!Result
!Record
!Opponent
!Method
!Round, time
!Date
!Location
!Notes
|-
|4
|Loss
|align=center|2–1–1
| Timer Nikulin
|align=center| 
|align=center|4
|align=center|Oct 26, 2021
|align=left|
|-
|3
|Win
| align=center|2–0–1
|  J.C. Hillard
| align=center|TKO
| align=center|2 (4), 
| align=center|Nov 20, 2004
|align=left|
|
|-
|2
|Win
|align=center|1–0–1
| Kenyatta Quitman
| align=center| 
| align=center|2 (4), 
| align=center|May 15, 2004
|align=left|
|
|-
|1
|style="background: #B0C4DE"|Draw
|align=center|0–0–1
| Matt Ives
|align=center|
|align=center|4
|align=center|Apr 23, 2004
|align=left|
|
|-

Bare-knuckle boxing record

|- 
|Loss
|align=center|0–1
| Alexander Emelianenko
|Decision (unanimous)
|Hardcore FC: Russia vs. USA
|
|align=center|3
|align=center|3:00
|Moscow, Russia
|

Submission grappling record
{| class="wikitable sortable" style="font-size:80%; text-align:left;"
|-
| colspan=8 style="text-align:center;" | 16 Matches, 9 Wins (4 Submissions), 4 Losses (0 Submissions), 3 Draws
|-
!  Result
!  style="text-align:center;"| Rec.
!  Opponent
!  Method
!  Event
!  Date
!  Location
|-
|Win
|style="text-align:center;"|9–4–3
| Aleksey Molchakov
|Submission (Rear-naked choke)
|Kingdom Professional Fight: Selection 4
|July 18, 2020
| St. Petersburg, Russia
|-
|Win
|style="text-align:center;"|8–4–3
| Warren Brooks
|Submission (Rear-naked choke)
|Submission Underground 2
|December 10, 2016
| Portland, Oregon
|-
|Win
|style="text-align:center;"|7–4–3
| Shannon Ritch
|Submission (Kimura)
|A-Fight MMA 4
|October 9, 2016
| Nevinnomyssk, Russia
|-
|Loss
|style="text-align:center;"|6–4–3
| Levan Persaev
| Decision (Unanimous)
|Octagon Fighting Sensation 9
|October 6, 2016
| Sukhumi, Georgia
|-
|Draw
|style="text-align:center;"|6–3–3
| Eduard Kuntudaev
| Draw
|Red City Fights 6
|September 4, 2016
| Yoshkar-Ola, Russia
|-
|Win
|style="text-align:center;"|6–3–2
| Maxim Kiselev
| Submission (North-south choke)
|PRIDE Fighting Show 1
|April 23, 2016
| Nizhny Novgorod, Russia
|-
|Draw
|style="text-align:center;"|5–3–2
| Aleksey Budimirov
| Draw (Unanimous)
|Fight Stars: Battle on Sura 5
|April 16, 2016
| Penza, Russia
|-
|Draw
|style="text-align:center;"|5–3–1
| Isa Umarov
| Draw (Unanimous)
|Kunlun Fight 1
|January 25, 2014
| Pattaya, Thailand
|-
|Win
|style="text-align:center;"|5–3
| Gabriel Gonzaga
| Decision
|2005 ADCC Championships
|May 28, 2005
| Long Beach, California
|-
|Loss
|style="text-align:center;"|4–3
| Ryron Gracie
| Decision (Points)
|Ultimate Submission Showdown 2003
| October 11, 2003
|  Torrance, California
|-
|Loss
|style="text-align:center;"|4–2
| Mark Robinson
| Decision
|2001 ADCC World Championship
| April 11, 2001
| Abu Dhabi, United Arab Emirates
|-
|Loss
|style="text-align:center;"|4–1
| Ricardo Arona
| Decision
|2000 ADCC World Championship
|March 1, 2000
| Abu Dhabi, United Arab Emirates
|-
|Win
|style="text-align:center;"|4–0
| Saulo Ribeiro
| Decision
|rowspan=4|1999 ADCC World Championship 
|rowspan=4|February 24, 1999
|rowspan=4| Abu Dhabi, United Arab Emirates
|-
|Win
|style="text-align:center;"|3–0
| Rigan Machado
|Decision (Points)
|-
|Win
|style="text-align:center;"|2–0
| Roberto Traven
|Decision (Points)
|-
|Win
|style="text-align:center;"|1–0
| Fabiano Capoani
|Decision (Points)
|-

See also

 List of Strikeforce alumni
 List of male mixed martial artists
 List of mixed martial artists with professional boxing records
 List of people from Olympia, Washington
 List of people who entered an Alford plea

References

External links

 
 
 
 
  at MMA Fighting
 Jeff Monson articles at libcom.org

1971 births
Sportspeople from Saint Paul, Minnesota
American anarchists
American communists
American Christians
American male sport wrestlers
American male mixed martial artists
American sportspeople in doping cases
American emigrants to Russia
Doping cases in mixed martial arts
Mixed martial artists from Minnesota
Light heavyweight mixed martial artists
Mixed martial artists from Washington (state)
People awarded a black belt in Brazilian jiu-jitsu
Heavyweight mixed martial artists
Mixed martial artists utilizing collegiate wrestling
Mixed martial artists utilizing boxing
Mixed martial artists utilizing Brazilian jiu-jitsu
Industrial Workers of the World members
Living people
American male boxers
Oregon State Beavers wrestlers
Mixed martial artists from Florida
American practitioners of Brazilian jiu-jitsu
American submission wrestlers
Submission grapplers
University of Illinois alumni
Oregon State University alumni
University of Minnesota Duluth alumni
People who entered an Alford plea
Naturalised citizens of Russia
People from Coconut Creek, Florida
Timberline High School (Lacey, Washington) alumni
Heavyweight boxers
Ultimate Fighting Championship male fighters
World No-Gi Brazilian Jiu-Jitsu Championship medalists
Minnesota Duluth Bulldogs
College wrestling coaches in the United States
Russian anarchists
Russian communists
Communist Party of the Russian Federation members
United Russia politicians
Russian Christians